"Mickey" (originally titled as "Kitty") is a song recorded by American singer and choreographer Toni Basil for her debut studio album, Word of Mouth, in 1981. It was first recorded by the pop group Racey.  Mike Chapman and Nicky Chinn wrote the song, while production was helmed by Greg Mathieson and Trevor Veitch. Basil's version is new wave, featuring guitar, synthesizers and cheerleading chants. It garnered a mixed response from music critics, with some critics praising the radio-friendly nature of the song, while others described some of the lyrics as obscene.

Background
The song was originally performed by British pop group Racey, with the title "Kitty", and was included on their debut studio album Smash and Grab in 1979. The original Racey song did not include the "Oh Mickey, you're so fine" chant, which Basil added.

For years, it was rumored that the name was changed to Mickey because Basil developed a crush on the Monkees' drummer and lead vocalist Micky Dolenz, after meeting him on the set of their movie, Head, for which she was the choreographer. However, that claim has been denied by Basil, who has said that she "didn't really know Micky at all". In January 2020, Basil released a re-recording of the song as "Hey Mickey" to digital and streaming platforms.

Legal claims
On August 31, 2017, Basil filed a multi-claim lawsuit against Razor & Tie Direct, Forever 21, Disney, Viacom, VH1, and South Park. Basil alleged that the defendants had commercially used the song "Mickey" without a license and damaged her right of publicity, claiming excess of $25,000 in damages. Basil also filed a lawsuit against AMC on May 12, 2020, for the unauthorized use of "Mickey" in a trailer for Preacher. On August 27, 2020, a California state of appeals court affirmed dismissal of Basil's case.

Composition
According to the sheet music published at Musicnotes.com by Alfred Music, the song is written in the key of E major and is set in time signature of common time with a tempo of 145 beats per minute. Basil's vocal range spans two octaves, from B3 to C♯5.

Critical reception
Rock critic Robert Christgau commented on the perceived 'obscene' content of the lyric "So come on and give it to me / Any way you can / Any way you want to do it / I'll take it like a man". Christgau wrote in a review at the time that Basil "was the only woman ever to offer to take it up the ass on Top 40 radio." However, Basil adamantly denies this: "NO! That's ridiculous. People read shit into everything. It's not about anything dirty. You change the name from boy to girl" — i.e., from "Mickey" to "Kitty" — "and they read anything they want into it! When it's a guy singing about a girl, it's a sweet line. But when a girl sings it, it must mean butt-fucking! This is how the wrong foot gets cut off when the doc wheels you into the E.R. Then it's Micky Dolenz and butt-fucking."

The single scored number one on the US Billboard Hot 100 for one week and number two in the UK Singles Chart. The song was Basil's only Top 40 success. It was named Number 6 on VH1's 100 Greatest One Hit Wonders of the 80's.

Music video
The music video was directed, produced and choreographed by Basil herself. The cheerleaders featured in the video were members of a championship squad from Carson High School in Carson, California. The cheerleading uniform Basil wore in the music video was the one she actually wore in high school. According to Basil, "They didn't put anything in the budget, I did everything myself. And this is the actual cheer sweater from Las Vegas High."

Track listings and formats
US 7" single
"Mickey" – 3:36
"Thief on the Loose" – 3:50

International 7" single
"Mickey" – 3:36
"Hanging Around" – 4:06

US 12" single
"Mickey" (Special Club mix) (Short) – 4:32
"Mickey" (Special Club mix) (Long) – 5:58

Alternate US 12" single
"Mickey" (Special Club mix) – 5:58
"Mickey" (Spanish version) – 5:12

7" single
"Mickey" – 3:30
"Hanging Around" – 3:59

SG CD single (1994)
"Mickey" (Original Version) – 3:29
"Mickey" (7" New Mix) – 6:03
"Mickey" (12" New Mix) – 4:13
"Mickey" (12" Alternative Version) – 3:57
"Mickey" (7" Instrumental) – 6:16
"Mickey" (7" Smart E's Version) – 6:04
"Mickey" (12" Smart E's Version – 6:16
"Mickey" (Smart E's Dub) – 6:16

US CD single (1999)
"Mickey" (Radio Remix) – 3:29
"Mickey" ("Back to the Future" Club Mix) – 6:03
"Mickey" ("Killa Klub" Edit) – 3:57
"Mickey" ("Killa Klub" Mix) – 6:16
"Mickey" ("Killa Klub" Dub) – 6:04

HK CD single (1999)
"Mickey" (Radio Remix) – 3:29
"Mickey" ("Back to the Future" Club Mix) – 6:03
"Mickey" (Jason Nevins Radio Remix) – 4:13
"Mickey" ("Killa Klub" Edit) – 3:57
"Mickey" ("Killa Klub" Mix) – 6:16
"Mickey" ("Killa Klub" Dub) – 6:04

Digital rerecording (2020)
"Hey Mickey" – 4:12

Credits and personnel adapted from Word of Mouth album liner notes.

Charts

Weekly charts

Year-end charts

Certifications and sales

Lolly version

English singer Lolly covered "Mickey" and released it as a single in September 1999. Her version reached number four on the UK Singles Chart the same month. There is also a karaoke version of the cover on the album.

Track listings
UK CD1 and Australian CD single
"Mickey" – 3:35
"Sweetheart" – 2:52
"Mickey" (Karaoke version) – 3:35
"Mickey" (CD ROM video)

UK CD2
"Mickey" – 3:35
"Mickey" (Creator remix) – 5:58
"Mickey" (D-Bop remix edit) – 4:22
"Mickey" (The Bold & The Beautiful remix) – 5:50

UK cassette single
"Mickey" – 3:35
"Mickey" (Karaoke version) – 3:35

Charts

Weekly charts

Year-end charts

Other versions and adaptations

Adaptations and parodies
"Weird Al" Yankovic parodied this song for his 1983 self titled debut album as "Ricky", a parody of and tribute to I Love Lucy. Yankovic himself sang the Ricky part while voice actress Tress MacNeille performed the Lucy part.

Language versions
Carola Häggkvist released a Swedish version of the song in 1983, which achieved success in Scandinavia. The Swedish version had lyrics written by Ingela "Pling" Forsman for the 1983 album Främling.

Japanese comedian-musician Gorie scored no. 1 on the Japanese singles chart for two weeks with a Japanese-language version featuring vocals by American-born Jasmine Ann Allen.

Samplings
The entire structure of the Run–D.M.C. song "It's Tricky" was consciously lifted from "Mickey". According to DMC: "I just changed the chorus around and we just talked about how this rap business can be tricky to a brother."

See also
List of Billboard Hot 100 number-one singles of 1982
List of number-one singles in Australia during the 1980s
List of number-one singles of 1982 (Canada)

References

1979 songs
1982 singles
1999 singles
Billboard Hot 100 number-one singles
Bubblegum pop songs
Carola Häggkvist songs
Cheerleading
Chrysalis Records singles
Music videos directed by Toni Basil
Number-one singles in Australia
Polydor Records singles
RPM Top Singles number-one singles
Song recordings produced by Mike Chapman
Songs written by Mike Chapman
Songs written by Nicky Chinn
Toni Basil songs
Virgin Records singles